In loop quantum gravity theory, a Planck star is a hypothetical astronomical object, theorized as a compact, exotic star, that exists within a black hole's event horizon, created when the energy density of a collapsing star reaches the Planck energy density. Under these conditions, assuming gravity and spacetime are quantized, a repulsive "force" arises from Heisenberg's uncertainty principle. The accumulation of mass-energy inside the Planck star cannot collapse beyond this limit because it violates the uncertainty principle for spacetime itself.

The key feature of this theoretical object is that this repulsion arises from the energy density, not the Planck length, and starts taking effect far earlier than might be expected. This repulsive "force" is strong enough to stop the star's collapse well before a singularity is formed and, indeed, well before the Planck scale for distance. Since a Planck star is calculated to be considerably larger than the Planck scale, there is adequate room for all the information captured inside a black hole to be encoded in the star; thus, avoiding information loss.

While it might be expected that such a repulsion would act very quickly to reverse the collapse of a star, it turns out that the relativistic effects of the extreme gravity of such an object slow down time for the Planck star to a similarly extreme degree. Seen from outside the star's Schwarzschild radius, the rebound from a Planck star takes approximately fourteen billion years, such that even primordial black holes are only now starting to rebound from an outside perspective.
Furthermore, the emission of Hawking radiation can be calculated to correspond to the timescale of gravitational effects on time, such that the event horizon that "forms" a black hole evaporates as the rebound proceeds.

Carlo Rovelli and Francesca Vidotto, who first proposed the existence of Planck stars, theorized in 2014 that Planck stars form inside black holes as a solution to the black hole firewall and the black hole information paradox. Confirmation of emissions from rebounding black holes could prove loop quantum gravity. Recent work demonstrates that Planck stars may exist inside black holes as part of a cycle between black and white holes.

A somewhat analogous object theorized under string theory is the fuzzball, which similarly eliminates the singularity within a black hole and accounts for a way to preserve the quantum information that falls into a black hole's event horizon.

See also
 List of nearest black holes
 Supermassive black hole
 Intermediate-mass black hole
 Stellar black hole
 Micro black hole

References

Star types
Hypothetical stars
Black holes